In the Parliament of Australia, the Manager of Government Business in the Senate is a government member, usually a minister, whose responsibilities include  negotiating with the Manager of Opposition Business in the Senate regarding proceedings in the Australian Senate. Among other things, negotiations would involve the order in which Government bills and other items of business, the time allotted for debate, and the timing of Opposition business. The position is distinct to that of Leader of the Government in the Senate and party whip, each of which also have deputy positions.

List

See also
 Leader of the Government in the Senate (Australia)
 Leader of the House (Australia)
 Manager of Opposition Business in the House (Australia)

References

Lists of political office-holders in Australia
Politics of Australia
Australian Senate